Planning Policy Statement 22: Renewable Energy commonly abbreviated as PPS 22, is a document produced by the British Government which sets out the Government's policies for renewable energy, which planning authorities should have regard to when preparing local development documents and when taking planning decisions. The current version was introduced in August 2004 and replaced Revised PPG 22.

See also
Planning Policy Statements
Town and country planning in the United Kingdom
Planning and Compulsory Purchase Act 2004
The Merton Rule

United Kingdom planning policy